Hydrodefluorination (HDF) is a type of organic reaction in which in a substrate of a carbon–fluorine bond is replaced by a carbon–hydrogen bond. The topic is of some interest to scientific research. In one general strategy for the synthesis of fluorinated compounds with a specific substitution pattern, the substrate is a cheaply available perfluorinated hydrocarbon. An example is the conversion of hexafluorobenzene (C6F6) to pentafluorobenzene (C6F5H) by certain zirconocene hydrido complexes. In this type of reaction the thermodynamic driving force is the formation of a metal-fluorine bond that can offset the cleavage of the very stable C-F bond. Other substrates that have been investigated are fluorinated alkenes. 
Another reaction type is oxidative addition of a metal into a C-F bond  followed by a reductive elimination step in presence of a hydrogen source. For example, perfluoronated pyridine reacts with bis(cyclooctadiene)nickel(0) and triethylphosphine to the oxidative addition product and then with HCl to the  ortho-hydrodefluorinated product. 
In reductive hydrodefluorination the fluorocarbon is reduced in a series of single electron transfer steps through the radical anion, the radical and the anion with ultimate loss of a fluorine anion. An example is the conversion of pentafluorobenzoic acid to 3,4,5-tetrafluorobenzoic acid in a reaction of zinc dust in aqueous ammonia.

Specific systems that have been reported for fluoroalkyl group HDF are triethylsilane / carborane acid,  and NiCl2(PCy3)2 / (LiAl(O-t-Bu)3H)

References

Organic reactions